There are no LGBT rights in Qatar, with homosexuality as well as campaigning for LGBT rights criminalised. As such, when Qatar was selected to host the 2022 FIFA World Cup, the choice to do so in a restrictive nation saw much criticism, with several topics becoming the subject of controversy.

LGBT fans

Public displays of affection 
As early as 2010, concerns have been raised about the rights of members of the LGBT community who attend the tournament, since homosexuality is illegal in Qatar. After Qatar was chosen as host, Sepp Blatter, the then-president of FIFA, was criticised for apparently jokingly telling a reporter inquiring about these concerns that gay attendees "should refrain from any sexual activities". In apology for the statement, Blatter assured that FIFA did not tolerate discrimination, and stated that "[FIFA] don't want any discrimination. What we want to do is open this game to everybody, and to open it to all cultures, and this is what we are doing in 2022."

The Human Rights Watch reported that Qatar has arbitrarily arrested LGBT people and subjected them to ill-treatment in detention. The Gay Times reported that while Muslims can be sentenced to death for homosexuality under Sharia law, there have been no known cases of the death penalty being enforced for homosexuality in Qatar.

In 2013, Hassan al-Thawadi stated that everyone would be welcome at Qatar 2022, but warned against public displays of affection because they were "not part of our culture and tradition". The Qatar organising committee seemed to retract this in September 2022, when Football Association (the FA; England's federation) chief executive Mark Bullingham said there had been assurances that LGBT couples would not face arrest while holding hands or kissing in public in Qatar. However, shortly before the tournament commenced, former Qatar international player and World Cup ambassador Khalid Salman described homosexuality as a "damage in the mind" in an interview with German broadcaster ZDF, which led to further criticism, including from the German government. The interview was cut short following the comments; Salman later said that his comments had been misrepresented by news agencies.

Rumours of homosexuality medical test 

After rumours and allegations that Qatar would introduce "medical screening tests" to "detect" and ban homosexuals from entering the country, LGBT rights activist Peter Tatchell said that "FIFA now has no option but to cancel the World Cup in Qatar". However, no such screening test exists. It was later revealed that this proposal came from Kuwait and, while involving other nearby nations, did not involve Qatar.

FIFA defence and legacy in football 
In a news conference on the day before the opening match, confronting renewed criticisms that LGBT+ fans felt unsafe, FIFA president Gianni Infantino continued to defend that "everyone who comes to Qatar is welcome, whatever religion, race, sexual orientation, belief she or he has, everyone is welcome. This was our requirement and the Qatari state sticks to that requirement", and argued that anti-LGBT laws "exist in many countries in the world", and "existed in Switzerland [where FIFA is based and Infantino was raised] when they organised the World Cup in 1954."

The BBC published a report based on interviews with LGBT+ fans from Qatar and from Western nations in December 2022. It looked at the effect that the attitude of the organising committee and FIFA (particularly Infantino) towards LGBT+ rights in preparation for and during the World Cup had on fans' feelings and views of football culture and homosexuality in football. Many fans reflected that they had previously felt that the footballing world was at or approaching a positive and supportive place in terms of accepting LGBT+ fans and players. The British attitude noted in the BBC report was that fans considered LGBT+ people being treated equally to be an uncontroversial matter of fact, and a fundamental human right, with fans having become used to seeing overt support from the footballing world. By instead seeing FIFA allow LGBT+ rights to revert to a debate, and one based on culture rather than human rights, during the World Cup, these fans were shocked; the BBC also noted that there was shock at Infantino repeatedly saying that people who wanted FIFA to condemn Qatar's stance on LGBT+ rights were only trying to stir a culture war.

It concluded that the legacy of the Qatar World Cup would be to set back LGBT+ acceptance in football, discouraging LGBT+ fans from feeling that they have a place. The attitude of FIFA, suggesting that it will not support LGBT+ rights as "divisive", was said by the report to make football seem more hostile to LGBT+ players; it quoted Finnish women's footballer Linda Sällström ironically asking what FIFA would do to the numerous openly gay female players set to compete at the 2023 FIFA Women's World Cup if an armband with implicit awareness of homosexuality had been enough to warrant punishment in 2022.

Promotion of LGBT rights in Qatar 
In January 2022, openly gay Australian footballer Josh Cavallo suggested he would support the World Cup happening in Qatar if it could cause laws to be changed, describing this possibility as "a fantastic opportunity" for the nation, having previously expressed fear of travelling to the nation before the organising committee told him he would be welcome.

In October 2022, Human Rights Watch called on FIFA to press Qatar to launch reforms that protected LGBT people after a Qatari official denied that there were cases of LGBT people beaten in jail. Qatari officials also rejected allegations that there were conversion therapy centers in Qatar.

The openly queer BBC Sport television pundit Alex Scott reported throughout the World Cup in Qatar, saying ahead of the opening match that there were people who had suggested she stay at home, but she had instead wanted to use the platform of being at the World Cup to highlight and address the issues, which she did on several occasions.

Joe Lycett stunt 
On 13 November 2022, a week before the tournament was due to kick off, British comedian Joe Lycett released a video criticising David Beckham for his lucrative sponsorship deal promoting the World Cup, due to the country's stance on LGBT rights. In the video, Lycett promised to give £10,000 to charities that support queer people in football if Beckham pulled out of the deal. If Beckham did not pull out of the deal, he said he would shred the money during a livestream on 20 November, just before the opening ceremony. After the deadline passed with no response from Beckham or his representatives, Lycett broadcast such a livestream; it was later revealed that this was a ruse, with Lycett saying that he had donated the money to charity, having had no intention from the start of destroying money.

Team apparel

OneLove armband 

Several European captains – those of England, Wales, Belgium, Denmark, Germany, Switzerland and the Netherlands – were planning to wear OneLove armbands, which feature a multi-colored design and the phrase "OneLove". This was intended "to promote inclusion and send a message against discrimination of any kind". Widely seen as tacit support of the LGBTQ+ community, some felt it targeted Qatar's anti-LGBT laws. FIFA, who impose a fine on teams who wear unofficial armband designs at the World Cup, did not immediately comment on the issue. On 21 November, after the tournament had started but before any of the European nations had played, however, the relevant football associations were told the players would receive yellow cards if they wore the armband. It was later revealed by the Danish Football Association (DBU) that FIFA had not planned to tell the European teams of the potential punishment for wearing the OneLove armband; that the FA called FIFA to their team hotel for an emergency meeting on 21 November, the day of England's first match; and that at this meeting FIFA told the collected teams that a yellow card would be the "minimum" punishment for wearing the armbands, with other possibilities including banning the captains altogether.

FIFA were criticised by fans and the football associations for forcing captains to choose between representing their countries and using their voice, with the Pride in Football LGBTQ+ supporters group also criticising the players for not doing so anyway, saying: "A token gesture from the start that has turned into another embarrassment from FIFA. FIFA have had since September to sort this, and yet they wait until now to threaten sanction. Fifa is denying players their fundamental and most basic human right to freedom of speech. Countries, teams and players are happy to defend LGBTQ+ people until they themselves are at risk. LGBTQ+ Qataris face a bigger punishment than just a yellow card. The gestures and the activism ended quite easily at the thought of reprimand."

There were multiple incidents relating to LGBT symbols in Group B matches, with the United Kingdom and United States (England, Wales, and the US were all in Group B) governments also criticising FIFA for introducing player punishment for the armbands. Later in the week, Irish foreign minister Simon Coveney criticised the world football governing body in his country's parliament, describing it as "absolutely extraordinary" that FIFA not only took the decision to ban the armbands, but kept changing their reason as to why, including shifting the blame by saying it was because of other national teams. Coveney also said: "That is a political intervention by FIFA to limit freedom of expression, which is worthy of significant mention and criticism." In the media, British newspaper Metro changed its website logo to a rainbow to protest the FIFA decision. Alex Scott wore the armband pitch-side before the England vs Iran match. Scott had earlier (during the opening ceremony, which the BBC elected not to broadcast, holding a studio panel discussion of Qatar controversies instead) criticised Infantino for a rambling speech in which he, in a seeming attempt to downplay the controversies of the tournament, claimed he understood what gay people in Qatar (among other minorities) felt like because he had experienced discrimination before.

On 22 November, the German Football Association (DFB) announced that they were taking legal action against FIFA for the decision, submitting a case to the Court of Arbitration for Sport. The German team played their first match the next day, and covered their mouths with their hands during their team photo as a protest against FIFA, signalling that they had been silenced. Qatari television hosts later mimicked the gesture when Germany were eliminated from the World Cup in the group stage, seen to be mocking the campaign. The FA, England football's governing body, also announced they were exploring legal options, saying that it understands World Cup rules would only administer a fine for kit violations and that FIFA may be attempting to enforce IFAB rules, which could allow them to implement other sanctions and which England believe should not apply to the World Cup, instead.

On 23 November, the DBU, as well as revealing FIFA's threat of significant player punishment, confirmed that they and other UEFA teams were discussing a blanket withdrawal from FIFA, and said that they would not support the reelection of Infantino as FIFA president while they were still members. On the same day, a Danish TV 2 reporter wearing a OneLove armband while broadcasting from outside a stadium was approached by security officials, who told him to remove the armband and tried to block the camera.

Fans began buying OneLove armbands after the ban and according to Badge Direct, who produce the armbands, they were sold out by 24 November. In response, FIFA allowed teams to wear the official "no discrimination" armbands intended for the quarter-finals during the group stage.

Other team items 
On 21 November, FIFA rejected Belgium's away jerseys due to the word "Love" being on the inside of the collar, even though it was unrelated to any campaign supporting LGBT rights.

The United States included a rainbow in their team branding, replacing the red stripes in their logo with differently-coloured ones to create a Pride rainbow, but only used this for facilities used by the team, not on their jerseys. The Football Association of Wales said they would not withdraw from FIFA over the armband ban, but were otherwise heavily critical and put up rainbow flags at their outdoor training grounds in protest.

Rainbow flag confiscations 

On several occasions the Qatari organisers promised to comply with FIFA rules on promoting tolerance, including LGBT issues. In December 2020, Nasser Al-Khater, the Qatar World Cup chief executive, assured that, in accordance with FIFA's inclusion policy, it would not restrict the display of pro-LGBT imagery and symbols (such as rainbow flags) at matches during the World Cup, saying: "When it comes to the rainbow flags in the stadiums, FIFA have their own guidelines, they have their rules and regulations, whatever they may be, we will respect them."

However, in April 2022, a senior security official overseeing the tournament stated that there were plans to confiscate pride flags from spectators, claiming it to be a safety measure to protect the fans from altercations with spectators that are anti-LGBT. Fare network criticised the report, arguing that actions against the LGBT community by the state were of a greater concern to those attending the World Cup than the actions of individuals.

A Brazilian journalist had his phone seized by authorities when people mistook a flag representing his state, Pernambuco, which includes a rainbow within a larger design, for an LGBT flag. Other Brazilian fans from the region reported similar incidents of having flags taken from them because of the rainbow.

Other rainbow apparel

Group B 
US journalist Grant Wahl was detained for half an hour, before the United States' opener against Wales. He was wearing a black shirt with a rainbow on the front. He was told his shirt was not allowed due to it being "political". After 25 minutes, a security commander allowed him into the venue and apologised, and he also received an apology from a representative of FIFA. Wahl later passed away from an aortic rupture secondary to an aortic aneurysm on 10 December while reporting on a match in Qatar.

Female Wales fans and Football Association of Wales (FAW) staff (including former Wales women's football captain Laura McAllister) had rainbow bucket hats, produced by the FAW, confiscated at the same game. The FAW said they were "extremely disappointed" and they would be raising the incidents with FIFA the following day; FIFA subsequently opened talks about rainbow apparel with Qatari officials on 22 November.

According to BBC reporter Natalie Perks, she and a cameraman were prevented from entering Al Bayt Stadium ahead of the England vs United States Group B game on 25 November because the cameraman was found to have a rainbow-decorated watch and strap in his possession, which had been gifted to him by his son. Perks said they were eventually permitted entry to the stadium after dialling a number aimed specifically at media personnel to help them if they encountered difficulties. According to The Guardian, a reporter for The Times newspaper was questioned at the same stadium around the same game because of a wristband they were wearing.

Other matches 
Despite FIFA reassuring fans that rainbow coloured apparel would be allowed inside the stadium after the Group B incidents, Qatari officials continued to confiscate rainbow-coloured items from several fans.

One fan attending a Group A final round game involving the Dutch national team on 29 November claimed to have had a security guard scream in his face, was forced to take off a multi-coloured baseball cap he was wearing and then was forced to strip his clothes, including his underwear. He then said his cap disappeared and security staff claimed he wasn't wearing it at all, only for it to emerge from behind a scanner. Then, when his ticket was being checked he was told to stand in the corner, where he was surrounded by seven people, four of whom were police and one of whom was wearing a FIFA uniform, where further threats were made.

In a match between Portugal and Uruguay, in which Uruguay lost 2–0, a protestor invaded the pitch, waving a rainbow flag.

Homophobic football chants 
A perennial issue in the sport in some countries, homophobic football chants were reported to be heard at the first matches involving Mexico and Ecuador, particularly from Ecuador fans towards Chile and the Qatar team during the tournament's opening match, with FIFA opening hearings to determine disciplinary action. Mexico was subject of a second disciplinary measure by FIFA after the final group stage match against Saudi Arabia because of homophobic chants during the course of the game.

References 

2022 World Cup
FIFA World Cup controversies